The hybrid elm cultivar Ulmus × hollandica 'Pioneer' is an American clone arising from the crossing of two European species, Wych Elm U. glabra (female parent) and Field Elm U. minor. Raised by the USDA  station at Delaware, Ohio, in 1971, 'Pioneer' was released to commerce in 1983.

Description

'Pioneer' is a fast-growing tree distinguished by a dense, globular crown, which as it matures becomes more broad than tall, like its U. glabra parent, and casting a heavy shade. The leaves are deep green, and similar in shape to the Wych Elm, colouring yellow and red in the fall. The perfect, apetalous wind-pollinated flowers appear in early March.

Pests and diseases
The tree's resistance to Dutch elm disease, rated 4 out of 5, is somewhat less than more recent American hybrids, and for this reason the tree was omitted from the elm trials  in eastern Arizona conducted by the Northern Arizona University. 'Pioneer' is also severely damaged by the Elm Leaf Beetle Xanthogaleruca luteola, sustaining more foliar damage (50%) than any other cultivar in an assessment conducted as part of the National Elm Trial at U C Davis, and Japanese Beetle. Tolerance of Elm Yellows in the United States was also found to be poor.

The tree's foliage was adjudged "resistant" to Black Spot by the Plant Diagnostic Clinic of the University of Missouri .

Cultivation
Considered "quite hardy in Saint Paul", and "definitely a good selection for the Twin Cities (St. Paul and Minnesota) urban forest" although very different in appearance to the American Elm.  'Pioneer' has had a very limited introduction to Europe, featuring in street tree trials in several Dutch cities in the late 1990s. The tree has reputedly been planted in Preston Park, Brighton, and along Tisbury Road, Hove, but does not feature in the NCCPG National Elm Collection held there.

Accessions

North America
Bartlett Tree Experts, US. Acc. nos. 85–0195, 85–0199
Denver Botanic Gardens, US. No acc. details.
Dawes Arboretum, Newark, Ohio, US. 1 tree (2022), accession no. D1986-0021.001
Dominion Arboretum, Ottawa, Canada. No acc. details.
Holden Arboretum, US. Acc. no. 90–58
New York Botanical Garden, US. Acc. no. 955/97
Smith College, US. Acc. no. 5603.
University of Idaho Arboretum, US. One tree. Acc. no. 1990013
U S National Arboretum , Washington, D.C., US. Acc. no. 76233.

Europe
Grange Farm Arboretum, Sutton St. James, Spalding, Lincolnshire, UK. Acc. No. 544

Nurseries

North America
Bailey Nurseries , St. Paul, Minnesota, US.
ForestFarm , Williams, Oregon, US.
Johnson's Nursery , Menomonee Falls, Wisconsin, US.
Pea Ridge Forest , Hermann, Missouri, US.
Sun Valley Garden Centre , Eden Prairie, Minnesota, US.

Europe
Batouwe Boomkwekerij B.V., Dodewaard, Netherlands.
Noordplant , Glimmen, Netherlands.
Van Den Berk (UK) Ltd., London, UK
Westerveld Boomkwekerij B.V., Opheusden, Netherlands.

References

External links
http://www.extension.iastate.edu/Publications/SUL4.pdf Summary, inc. photographs, of elm cultivars resistant to Dutch elm disease available in the United States.
https://web.archive.org/web/20030413074605/http://fletcher.ces.state.nc.us/programs/nursery/metria/metria11/warren/elm.htm  Warren, K., J. Frank Schmidt & Son Co. (2002).  The Status of Elms in the Nursery Industry in 2000.

Dutch elm cultivar
Ulmus articles with images
Ulmus